is a Japanese professional baseball pitcher who is currently a free agent. He has played in Nippon Professional Baseball (NPB) for the Saitama Seibu Lions.

Career
Saitama Seibu Lions selected Tawata with the first selection in the 2015 NPB draft.

On May 14, 2016, Tawata made his NPB debut.

On October 10, 2018, he was selected Japan national baseball team at the 2018 MLB Japan All-Star Series.

On December 2, 2020, he become a free agent.

References

External links

 NPB.com

1993 births
Living people
Baseball people from Okinawa Prefecture
Japanese baseball players
Nippon Professional Baseball pitchers
Saitama Seibu Lions players